The 2017 season was the Detroit Lions' 88th in the National Football League (NFL), their 84th as the Detroit Lions, and their fourth and final season under head coach Jim Caldwell. The Lions finished with a 9–7 record, the same record they had in 2016, but unlike the previous year, failed to qualify for the playoffs. After starting the season 3–1, they lost 6 of their next 12 games. They were mathematically eliminated from playoff contention in week 16 following their loss to the Cincinnati Bengals. Despite missing the playoffs, the Lions recorded consecutive winning seasons for the first time since 1994–1995. They also won all of their division road games for the first time ever and swept their division rival Green Bay Packers for the first time since 1991. Despite this, Caldwell was dismissed by the Lions after the season, having accumulating a winning record of 36–28 (4–25 against teams that finished with winning records), but no playoff wins, in four seasons. The team also unveiled a new uniform set and logo, which removed the black that had been used a secondary color since 2003, as well an all-silver uniform in week 15.

The Lions would not record another winning season until 2022.

Offseason

Coaching staff
 On January 4, the Lions announced Jim Caldwell will return as head coach.
 On February 21, the Lions hired George Godsey as defensive assistant/special projects.

Re-signings

Additions

Departures

Trades
 On June 15, the Lions acquired offensive tackle Greg Robinson from Los Angeles Rams in exchange for a sixth-round draft pick in the 2018 NFL Draft.
 On August 31, the Lions traded offensive guard Laken Tomlinson to the San Francisco 49ers for a fifth-round draft pick in the 2019 NFL Draft.

Draft

Notes
 The Lions made two separate trades with the New England Patriots — acquiring an additional sixth-round selection (No. 215 overall) in exchange for linebacker Kyle Van Noy and their original seventh-round selection (No. 239 overall); and acquiring an additional seventh-round selection (No. 250 overall) in exchange for tight end Michael Williams.
 The Lions traded their original third-round selection (No. 85 overall) to the Patriots in exchange for the Patriots' third-round selection (No. 96 overall) and their fourth-round selection (No. 124 overall).

Staff

Final roster

Schedule

Preseason

Regular season

Note: Intra-division opponents are in bold text.

Game summaries

Week 1: vs. Arizona Cardinals

To open the regular season, the Lions hosted the Arizona Cardinals. The Cardinals took an early lead in the first quarter with an 82-yard interception return from Justin Bethel, followed by a 24-yard field goal from Phil Dawson. The Lions got on the board in the second quarter with a six-yard touchdown pass from Matthew Stafford to Marvin Jones Jr., and a 58-yard field goal from Matt Prater to make the score 10–9 in favor of Arizona at half-time. In the third quarter, the Cardinals added to their lead with a three-yard touchdown run from Kerwynn Williams, but the Lions responded with a seven-yard touchdown pass from Stafford to Theo Riddick. In the final quarter, the Lions took their first lead with a 10-yard touchdown pass from Stafford to Kenny Golladay. Stafford connected with Golladay again minutes later with a 45-yard touchdown pass, then Miles Killebrew returned an interception 35 yards for the Lions' final points. The Cardinals scored with a one-yard touchdown pass from Carson Palmer to J. J. Nelson, making the final score 35–23 in favor of Detroit. It was Matthew Stafford's 27th fourth quarter or overtime comeback since 2011, the most in the league.

Week 2: at New York Giants

In week 2, the Lions visited the New York Giants to play on Monday Night Football. The Lions took an early lead in the first quarter with a 27-yard touchdown pass from Matthew Stafford to Marvin Jones. The Giants tied the game in the second quarter with an 18-yard touchdown pass from Eli Manning to Evan Engram, but the Lions took the lead back (which they kept for the rest of the game) with a seven-yard touchdown pass from Stafford to Eric Ebron, and a 56-yard field goal by Matt Prater to make the score 17–7 in favor of Detroit at half-time. Each team only scored once in the second half: first the Giants with a 25-yard field goal by Aldrick Rosas in the third quarter, then the Lions with an 88-yard punt return by Jamal Agnew in the fourth quarter, making the final score 24–10 for the Lions' second consecutive win. The Lions started the season 2–0 for the first time since 2011, and won both games by double digits for the first time since 1980. Stafford threw his 193rd touchdown, passing Bob Griese for the 48th spot on the all-time list.

Week 3: vs. Atlanta Falcons

In week 3, the Lions hosted the Atlanta Falcons. The Falcons took an early lead in the first quarter with a four-yard touchdown pass from Matt Ryan to Mohamed Sanu. The Falcons scored 13 points in the second quarter via a 36-yard field goal from Matt Bryant, a one-yard touchdown run from Devonta Freeman, and a 48-yard field goal from Bryant. The Lions also scored 13 points in the second quarter via a 55-yard field goal from Matt Prater, a 40-yard field goal from Prater, and a 37-yard interception return from Glover Quin, to make the score 20–13 in favor of Atlanta at half-time. The Falcons extended their lead in the third quarter via a 40-yard field goal from Bryant. The Lions responded with an 11-yard touchdown pass from Matthew Stafford to Golden Tate, and a 35-yard field goal from Prater to tie the game at 23. The Falcons regained the lead in the fourth quarter via a 40-yard touchdown pass from Ryan to Taylor Gabriel. The Lions reduced the Falcons lead to four points with a 57-yard field goal from Prater. The Lions' attempted comeback failed when a touchdown pass from Stafford to Tate was overturned with eight seconds remaining in the game. Due to Tate being ruled down in the field of play and the Lions having no timeouts left, the ten-second runoff rule was invoked, ending the game and giving the Lions their first loss of the season.

Week 4: at Minnesota Vikings

In week 4, the Lions visited their divisional rival, the Minnesota Vikings. After a scoreless first quarter, the Lions got on the board with a 29-yard field goal by Matt Prater. The Vikings responded a few minutes later with a five-yard rushing touchdown by Dalvin Cook to make the score 7–3 in favor of Minnesota at half-time. The Lions scored 11 unanswered points in the second half. First, Prater kicked a 37-yard field goal to cut the Vikings' lead to three in the third quarter. Next, Detroit regained the lead with a three-yard rushing touchdown by Ameer Abdullah, followed by a two-point conversion pass from Matthew Stafford to T. J. Jones. Both third quarter scores followed Vikings fumbles that were recovered by the Lions. Detroit's Glover Quin forced another fumble by Adam Thielen with under two minutes left in the game, which was recovered by Tahir Whitehead to end Minnesota's attempt at a possible game-tying drive.

Week 5: vs. Carolina Panthers

In week 5, the Lions hosted the Carolina Panthers. The teams exchanged field goals in the first quarter, one from Matt Prater from 30-yards, and one from Graham Gano from 21-yards. The Lions regained the lead in the second quarter via a one-yard touchdown run from Zach Zenner. The Panthers responded with a six-yard touchdown pass from Cam Newton to Christian McCaffrey, and a 10-yard touchdown pass from Newtwon to Devin Funchess, to make the score 17–10 in favor of Carolina at half-time. The Panthers scored 10 points in the third quarter via a 31-yard touchdown pass from Newton to Kelvin Benjamin, and a 44-yard field from Gano. The Lions responded with 14 points in the fourth quarter via two touchdown receptions from Matthew Stafford to Darren Fells, from four-yards and 20-yards respectively, making the final score 27–24 in favor of Carolina. Detroit's loss dropped them to 2nd in the NFC North, as the Packers beat the Cowboys later in the day to move to 4–1.

Week 6: at New Orleans Saints

In week 6, the Lions visited the New Orleans Saints. The Saints opened the scoring in the first quarter via a fumble recovery in the end zone by Kenny Vaccaro. The Lions responded with a 45-yard touchdown pass from Matthew Stafford to Golden Tate to tie the game. The Saints regained the lead via a 20-yard touchdown pass from Drew Brees to Ted Ginn Jr. and a 41-yard field goal from Wil Lutz. The Saints scored 14 points in the second quarter via two touchdown runs from Mark Ingram II from one and two-yards respectively. Matt Prater recorded a 41-yard field goal to make the score 31–10 in favor of New Orleans at half-time. The Saints scored 14 points in the third quarter via a two-yard touchdown pass from Brees to Michael Hoomanawanui and a 27-yard interception return from Marshon Lattimore. The Lions responded with 28 straight points in the second half. The Lions scored 14 points in the third quarter via a 22-yard touchdown pass from Stafford to Marvin Jones Jr. and a 22-yard touchdown pass from Stafford to Darren Fells. The Lions scored 14 points in the fourth quarter via a 74-yard punt return from Jamal Agnew and a two-yard interception return from A'Shawn Robinson, reducing the Saints' lead to seven points. The Lions' attempted comeback failed when Stafford's pass intended for Eric Ebron was intercepted in the end zone by Cameron Jordan, making the final score 52–38 in favor of New Orleans.

Week 8: vs. Pittsburgh Steelers

In week 8 following their bye-week, the Lions hosted the Pittsburgh Steelers on Sunday Night Football. The teams exchanged field goals in the first quarter, one from Chris Boswell from 34-yards, and one from Matt Prater from 48-yards. The Lions scored nine points in the second quarter via three field goals from Prater, from 37-yards, 51-yards, and 34-yards, respectively. The Steelers responded with a five-yard touchdown run from Le'Veon Bell, to make the score 12–10 in favor of Detroit at half-time. The Steelers scored 10 points in the third quarter via a 38-yard field from Boswell, and a 97-yard touchdown pass from Ben Roethlisberger to JuJu Smith-Schuster. The Lions responded with a 19-yard field goal from Prater in the fourth quarter, making the final score 20–15 in favor of Pittsburgh.

The Lions had 482 total yards of offense without scoring a touchdown. This was the third-highest yardage total without a touchdown in NFL history.

Week 9: at Green Bay Packers

In week 9, the Lions visited their divisional rival, the Green Bay Packers, on Monday Night Football. The Lions took an early lead on their opening drive of the first quarter, which they kept the rest of the game, via a 25-yard touchdown pass from Matthew Stafford to Marvin Jones Jr. The Lions extended their lead in the second quarter via a four-yard touchdown run from Ameer Abdullah. The Packers responded with a 35-yard field goal from Mason Crosby, to make the score 14–3 in favor of Detroit at half-time. The Lions opened the scoring in the second-half via a 44-yard field goal from Matt Prater in the third quarter. The Lions scored 13 points in the fourth quarter via a 19-yard field goal from Prater, an 11-yard touchdown pass from Stafford to Jones, and a 31-yard field goal from Prater. The Packers scored 14 points in the fourth quarter via a one-yard touchdown run from Brett Hundley, and a one-yard touchdown run from Jamaal Williams as time expired, making the final score 30–17 in favor of Detroit, snapping their three-game losing streak. After 23 consecutive road losses against the Packers between 1992 and 2014, the Lions have now won two of the last three meetings in Green Bay.

Matthew Stafford recorded his 200th career touchdown in the first quarter of the game, becoming the fourth quarterback in NFL history to do so before turning 30 years old, a list also occupied by Brett Favre, Dan Marino, and Peyton Manning. The game also marked the first time the Lions did not punt in a game since Thanksgiving Day in 1971.

Week 10: vs. Cleveland Browns

In week 10, the Lions hosted the winless Cleveland Browns. The Browns scored 10 points in the first quarter via a 23-yard field goal from Zane Gonzalez, and a 19-yard touchdown pass from DeShone Kizer to Kenny Britt. The Lions responded with a 46-yard field goal from Matt Prater. The Lions tied the game in the second quarter via an eight-yard touchdown run from Ameer Abdullah, and took their first lead of the game via a 44-yard fumble return from Nevin Lawson, to make the score 17–10 in favor of Detroit at half-time. The Browns again tied the score in the third quarter via a six-yard touchdown run from Isaiah Crowell, and regained the lead via a one-yard touchdown run from Kizer. The Lions responded by scoring the final 21 points in the game, first with an eight-yard touchdown pass from Matthew Stafford to Theo Riddick in the third quarter, then via a pair of fourth quarter touchdown passes, first a 29-yard touchdown pass from Stafford to Eric Ebron, and next a 40-yard touchdown pass from Stafford to Golden Tate, making the final score 38–24 in favor of Detroit.

Week 11: at Chicago Bears

In week 11, the Lions visited their division rival, the Chicago Bears. The Bears scored 10 points in the first quarter via a 23-yard field goal from Connor Barth, and a one-yard touchdown pass from Mitchell Trubisky to Adam Shaheen. The Lions scored 21 points in the second quarter via a 27-yard fumble return from D. J. Hayden, a 28-yard touchdown pass from Matthew Stafford to Marvin Jones Jr. and a two-yard touchdown pass from Stafford to Ameer Abdullah. The Bears responded with a 12-yard touchdown run from Jordan Howard, to make the score 21–17 in favor of Detroit at half-time. After a scoreless third quarter, the Lions extended their lead in the fourth quarter via a 27-yard field goal from Matt Prater. The Bears responded with a 15-yard touchdown run from Tarik Cohen to tie the game. The Lions regained the lead via a 52-yard field goal from Prater. The Bears attempted comeback failed when Barth missed a potentially game-tying 46-yard field goal attempt with eight seconds remaining in the game, making the final score 27–24 in favor of Detroit. With the win, the Lions won all of their division games on the road in a season for the first time in franchise history.

Week 12: vs. Minnesota Vikings
See also NFL on Thanksgiving Day

For their annual Thanksgiving Day game, the Lions hosted a rematch with their divisional rival, the Minnesota Vikings. The Vikings scored 13 points in the first quarter via a one-yard touchdown pass from Case Keenum to Kyle Rudolph, and a nine-yard touchdown run from Keenum. The Lions responded with 10 points in the second quarter via a 32-yard field goal from Matt Prater and a six-yard touchdown pass from Matthew Stafford to Marvin Jones Jr. The Vikings extended their lead in the second quarter via a 22-yard touchdown pass from Keenum to Rudolph to make the score 20–10 in favor of Minnesota at half-time. The Vikings opened the scoring in the second half via a two-yard touchdown run from Latavius Murray. The Lions responded with two field goals from Prater in the third quarter from 32-yards, and 50-yards, respectively. The Lions reduced the Vikings lead to four points in the fourth via a 43-yard touchdown pass from Stafford to Jones. The Vikings extended their lead in the fourth quarter via a 36-yard field goal from Kai Forbath. The Lions' attempted comeback failed when Stafford's pass intended for Jones was intercepted by Xavier Rhodes. On the Vikings' ensuing drive, Forbath's 25-yard field goal attempt was blocked by Darius Slay and recovered by Nevin Lawson and returned for a 77-yard touchdown, which was then nullified due to an offside penalty on Slay, making the final score 30–23 in favor of Minnesota, snapping the Lions' three-game winning streak and snapping the team's four-game Thanksgiving Day win streak.

Week 13: at Baltimore Ravens

In week 13, the Lions visited the Baltimore Ravens. The Ravens opened the scoring in the first quarter via a 38-yard field goal from Justin Tucker. The Ravens added 17 points in the second quarter via a one-yard touchdown pass from Joe Flacco to Benjamin Watson, a three-yard touchdown pass from Flacco to Patrick Ricard, and a 46-yard field goal from Tucker, giving the Ravens a 20–0 lead at the intermission. After half-time, the Lions finally got on the board and scored 13 points in the third quarter via a four-yard touchdown run from Theo Riddick, and a six-yard touchdown run from Tion Green (the first of his career), reducing the Ravens' lead to seven points. The Ravens responded with 24 points in the fourth quarter via a seven-yard touchdown run from Alex Collins, a 51-yard field goal from Tucker, a six-yard touchdown run from Collins, and a 45-yard interception return from Eric Weddle. The Lions scored via a one-yard touchdown pass from Matthew Stafford to Nick Bellore, making the final score 44–20 in favor of Baltimore.

Week 14: at Tampa Bay Buccaneers

In week 14, the Lions visited the Tampa Bay Buccaneers. Each team exchanged touchdowns in the first quarter. First a two-yard touchdown run from Detroit's Theo Riddick, then a one-yard touchdown run from Tampa Bay's Doug Martin. The only score of the second quarter was a five-yard touchdown pass from Matthew Stafford to Golden Tate, to make the score 14–7 in favor of Detroit at half-time. The Lions scored the only points of the third quarter when Riddick ran in his second touchdown of the game, this time from 18-yards. Tampa Bay responded with back-to-back touchdowns in the fourth quarter, first with a two-yard touchdown pass from Jameis Winston to O. J. Howard, then a two-yard touchdown pass from Winston to Leonard Wester to tie the game at 21. Matt Prater kicked a 46-yard field goal with 20 seconds left in the game, making the final score 24–21 in favor of Detroit.

Week 15: vs. Chicago Bears

In week 15, the Lions donned brand new all-silver uniforms and hosted a Saturday evening rematch with their division rivals, the Chicago Bears. The Lions opened the scoring in the first quarter via a 48-yard field goal from Matt Prater. The Lions extended their lead in the second quarter via a 31-yard field goal from Prater, and a three-yard touchdown pass from Matthew Stafford to T. J. Jones. The Bears got on the board via a 41-yard field goal from Mike Nugent with two seconds remaining in the first half, to make the score 13–3 in favor of Detroit at half-time. The Lions scored the only points in the third quarter via an eight-yard touchdown pass from Stafford to Eric Ebron. The Bears scored the only points in the fourth quarter via a nine-yard touchdown pass from Mitchell Trubisky to Benny Cunningham, making the final score 20–10 in favor of Detroit.

Week 16: at Cincinnati Bengals

In week 16, the Lions visited the Cincinnati Bengals on Christmas Eve to finish their road schedule. The Lions took an early lead when Eric Ebron caught a 33-yard touchdown pass from Matthew Stafford for the only points of the first quarter. The Bengals' Randy Bullock kicked a pair of field goals in the second quarter, from 29-yards and 27-yards, respectively, to make the score 7–6 in favor of Detroit at half-time. The Lions extended their lead in the third quarter when Matt Prater kicked a 23-yard field goal, but then the Bengals took their first lead of the game when C. J. Uzomah caught a one-yard touchdown pass from Andy Dalton. In the fourth quarter the Bengals extended their lead when Bullock scored another field goal from 35-yards out, then Detroit's Tion Green ran in a touchdown from five-yards out to give the Lions a 17–16 lead. However, Cincinnati regained the lead when they added ten more points with a 51-yard field goal from Bullock and a 12-yard touchdown run from Giovani Bernard to make the final score 26–17 in favor of the Bengals. With the loss, the Lions were eliminated from playoff contention.

Week 17: vs. Green Bay Packers

To finish the season, the Lions hosted a rematch with their divisional rivals, the Green Bay Packers, on New Year's Eve. The teams exchanged field goals in the first quarter, one from Green Bay's Mason Crosby from 41-yards, and one from Detroit's Matt Prater from 28-yards. The Lions scored 17 points in the second quarter via a 54-yard touchdown pass from Matthew Stafford to Kenny Golladay, a three-yard touchdown pass from Stafford to Marvin Jones Jr., and a 30-yard field goal from Prater, to make the score 20–3 in favor of Detroit at half-time. The Lions extended their lead in the third quarter via a 71-yard touchdown pass from Stafford to Golden Tate. Each team exchanged touchdowns in the fourth quarter. First a 17-yard touchdown pass from Brett Hundley to Randall Cobb of the Packers, followed by a two-point conversion pass from Hundley to Cobb for the Packers. Then the Lions scored the game's final points with a seven-yard touchdown run from Ameer Abdullah, followed by a two-point conversion pass from Tate to Stafford, making the final score 35–11 in favor of Detroit. With the win, it marked the first time the Lions beat the Packers twice in the regular season since 1991. The Lions also had their first back-to-back winning seasons since 1994 and 1995.

Standings

Division

Conference

References

Detroit
Detroit Lions seasons
Detroit Lions